The randomized weighted majority algorithm is an algorithm in machine learning theory.
It improves the mistake bound of the weighted majority algorithm.

Example 
Imagine that every morning before the stock market opens,
we get a prediction from each of our "experts" about whether the stock market will go up or down.
Our goal is to somehow combine this set of predictions into a single prediction that we then use to make a buy or sell decision for the day.
The RWMA gives us a way to do this combination such that our prediction record will be
nearly as good as that of the single best expert in hindsight.

Motivation 
In machine learning, the weighted majority algorithm (WMA) is a meta-learning algorithm which "predicts from expert advice".
It is not a randomized algorithm:

 initialize all experts to weight 1.
 for each round:
     poll all the experts and predict based on a weighted majority vote of their predictions.
     cut in half the weights of all experts that make a mistake.

Suppose there are  experts and the best expert makes  mistakes.
The weighted majority algorithm (WMA) makes at most  mistakes,
which is not a very good bound.
We can do better by introducing randomization.

Randomized weighted majority algorithm (RWMA) 

The nonrandomized weighted majority algorithm (WMA) only guarantees an upper bound of
,
which is problematic for highly error-prone experts (e.g. the best expert still makes a mistake 20% of the time.)
Suppose we do  rounds using  experts.
If the best expert makes  mistakes,
we can only guarantee an upper bound of 
on our number of mistakes.

Instead of predicting based on majority vote, the weights are used as probabilities:
hence the name randomized weighted majority.
If  is the weight of expert ,
let .
We will follow expert  with probability .
The goal is to bound the worst-case expected number of mistakes,
assuming that the adversary (the world) has to select one of the answers
as correct before we make our coin toss.
Why is this better in the worst case?
Idea: the worst case for the deterministic algorithm (weighted majority algorithm)
was when the weights split 50/50.
But, now it is not so bad since we also have a 50/50 chance of getting it right.

Analysis 
At the -th round, define  to be the fraction of weight on the wrong answers. so,  is the probability we make a mistake on the -th round. Let  denote the total number of mistakes we made so far. Furthermore, we define , using the fact that expectation is additive. On the -th round,  becomes .
So,  
Let's say that   is the number of mistakes of the best expert so far. We can use the inequality  . Now we solve. First, take the natural log of both sides. We get: 
, Simplify:
, So,
.

Now, use , and the result is:

Let's see if we made any progress:

If , we get, 
if , we get, .  
so we can see we made progress.
Roughly, of the form .

Uses of Randomized Weighted Majority Algorithm (RWMA) 
The Randomized Weighted Majority Algorithm can be used to combine multiple algorithms in which case RWMA can be expected to perform nearly as well as the best of the original algorithms in hindsight.

Furthermore, one can apply the Randomized Weighted Majority Algorithm in situations where experts are making choices that cannot be combined (or can't be combined easily). For example, RWMA can be applied to repeated game-playing or the online shortest path problem. In the online shortest path problem, each expert is telling you a different way to drive to work. You pick one path using RWMA. Later you find out how well you would have done using all of the suggested paths and penalize appropriately. To do this right, we want to generalize from "losses" of 0 or 1 to losses in [0,1]. The goal is to have an expected loss not much larger than the loss of the best expert. The analysis given in the previous section does not change significantly.

Extensions 
 Multi-armed bandit problem.
 Efficient algorithm for some cases with many experts.
 Sleeping experts/"specialists" setting.

See also 
 Machine learning
 Weighted majority algorithm
 Game theory
 Multi-armed bandit

References

Further reading 
 Weighted Majority & Randomized Weighted Majority
 Avrim Blum (2004) machine learning theory
 Rob Schapire 2006 Foundations of Machine Learning
 Predicting From Experts Advice
 Uri Feige, Robi Krauthgamer, Moni Naor. Algorithmic Game Theory

Machine learning algorithms